is an 2019 action puzzle game developed by Tarsier Studios and published by Nintendo. It released for the Nintendo Switch on November 8.

Gameplay 
The Stretchers features lighthearted, ragdoll physics-based puzzles in which players are tasked with rescuing civilian "Dizzies"—residents that have been "dizzied" by the evil Captain Brains—and returning them to the hospital. Players take on the role of medics to reach the location of Dizzies via an ambulance, with the ability to drive recklessly off ramps and through obstacles such as fences and walls. 

The game can be played in single-player, in which one player controls both paramedics, or in two-player co-op, where each player controls one of the medics. Players can unlock character costumes and furniture for the medics' home base by exploring the world map and mission areas. The comical style and co-operative gameplay of The Stretchers is reminiscent of that of the Overcooked! series, while the careless ambulance driving has been compared to the gameplay of Crazy Taxi.

Reception 
The Stretchers received "generally favorable reviews" according to the review aggregator Metacritic.

Notes

References

External links 
 

2019 video games
Cooperative video games
Multiplayer and single-player video games
Nintendo games
Nintendo Switch-only games
Nintendo Switch games
Action video games
Puzzle video games
Medical video games
Video games developed in Sweden
Unreal Engine games